Maxime Nonnenmacher (born 23 July 2002) is a French professional footballer who plays as a midfielder for  club Nancy.

References 

2002 births
Living people
French footballers
Association football midfielders
Ligue 2 players
Championnat National 3 players
AS Nancy Lorraine players